Ernest Vincent Wright MC (24 October 1894 – 16 December 1977) was an English cricketer.  Wright was a right-handed batsman.  He was born at Kettering, Northamptonshire.

Wright served during World War I, by 1917 he was a temporary lieutenant, and in September of that year he was promoted to acting captain. By February 1918 he still held the simultaneous ranks of Temporary Lieutenant and Acting Captain in the Tank Corps. He was awarded the Military Cross, which was mentioned in the London Gazette in July 1918, for conspicuous gallantry and devotion to duty.  It was noted that he had commanded his tanks with great skill and judgement during an attack, and when his tank ran out of petrol he went forward on foot with the infantry and assisted in the capturing of an objective while under heavy fire, helping advance the line by some 7,000 yards. In February 1919, he relinquished his rank of temporary captain.

Following the war, Wright made two first-class cricket appearances for Northamptonshire in 1919 against Warwickshire and Sussex, both at the County Ground, Northampton. He scored a total of two runs in these matches. He died at the town of his birth of 16 December 1977.  His brothers Albert, Richard and Stephen all played first-class cricket for Northamptonshire.

References

External links
Ernest Wright at ESPNcricinfo
Ernest Wright at CricketArchive

1894 births
1977 deaths
Sportspeople from Kettering
British Army personnel of World War I
Royal Tank Regiment officers
Recipients of the Military Cross
English cricketers
Northamptonshire cricketers